Great Wrap is an Australian material science company that manufactures compostable stretch wrap.

History
Great Wrap was founded in 2020 by Jordy and Julia Kay. Their goal is to end the world reliance on petroleum-based plastic. In 2021, Great Wrap was named one of the  most innovative companies in the Asia Pacific.

Products 
Great Wrap sells compostable cling wrap made from potato waste. The wrap is certified home compostable, meaning it will break down in a compost pile leaving no microplastics behind. Great wrap is manufactured at the company's solar powered factory in Melbourne, Australia  and has the goal to become a fully circular business.

References 

Manufacturing companies based in Melbourne
Biodegradable plastics
Plastics companies of Australia
Biotechnology companies of Australia
Australian companies established in 2020